Vaishno Devi (also known as Mata Rani, Trikuta, Ambe and Vaishnavi) is a manifestation of the Hindu mother goddess Durga or Adi Shakti. The words "Maa" and "Mata" are commonly used in India for mother, and thus are often heavily used in connection with the goddess. Vaishno Devi took avatar from the combined energies of Mahakali, Mahalakshmi, and Mahasaraswati.

Legend

Author Abha Chauhan identifies Vaiṣṇō Dēvī with the power of Viṣṇu as well as the incarnation of Lakṣmī. Author Pintchman identifies with great goddess Mahadevi and says Vaiṣṇō Dēvī contains all powers and is associated with the entire creation as Mahadevi. Pintchman further states that, "Pilgrims identify Vaiṣṇō Dēvī with Durgā  whom North Indians (and others) also name Sheranwali, "the Lion-rider" more than with any other goddess".

Origin

Puran
According to Devi Bhagavata Purana, she is mentioned as Rudrasundari on Trikuta.<ref></ ref>

In the Varāha Purāṇa's Trikalā Māhātmya, she originated from Trikala (the goddess who was born from Trimurtis) and slayed an asura called Mahisha.

Tantra
As per Varahi Tantra, this Shaktipeeth was named as Sumangala Trikutaparvat.

Worship 
The Appearance of Vaishno Devi to Shridhar and the story of Bhairav Nath
It is said that Bhairav Nath, a famous Tantric, saw the young Vaishno Devi at an agricultural fair and fell madly in love with her. Vaishno Devi fled into Trikuta hills to escape his amorous advances, later she assumed the form of Mahakali and cut off his head with her sword in a cave. Professor and author Tracy Pintchman narrates the story as, "About nine hundred years ago Vaishno Devi appeared in the form of a young girl and commanded a Brahmin named Shridhar from the village Hansali  (next to present day Katra) to hold a feast (bhandara) for local people near Bhumika stream. At the time of feast, Bhairav Nath, a disciple of Goraknath, appeared and demanded meat and liquor. But Vaishno Devi told him he would get only vegetarian food, since this was a Brahmin's feast. Seeing her, Bhairav Nath lusted after her. To escape him, she ran away stopping at various places on the trail up the Trikuta mountain. There places are now known as Banganga (Ganga river emerged from arrow), Charan Paduka (Holy footprints), Ardha Kunwari the place where she is said to have remained for nine months in a cave,  and finally at Bhavan, the cave that is now known as her home. There taking the form of Chamundi (a form of Kali), she beheaded Bhairav Nath. His body held at the entrance to the cave, and his head landed further up the mountain at a place where a Bhairav Nath temple is now located. Bhairav Nath then repented, and the goddess granted him further salvation. In so doing, however, she laid down the condition that unless pilgrims coming for her darshana did not also get his darshana that is, darshana of his head then their pilgrimage would not be fruitful. Vaishno Devi later manifested into 3 small rocks (pindikas) and stays there to the present day. Shridhar began doing puja to the pindikas at the cave, and his descendants continue to do so even today".

Professor and author Manohar Sajnani says, According to Hindu beliefs, the original abode of Vaishno Devi was Ardha Kunwari, a place about halfway between Katra town and the cave. She meditated in the cave for 9 months just like how a baby stays in its mother's womb for 9 months. It is said that when Bhairav Nath ran after Vaishno Devi to catch her.  The Devi reached near a cave in the hill, she called up Hanuman and told him that "I would do penance in this cave for nine months, till then you should not allow Bhairav Nath to enter the cave." Hanuman obeyed the mother's orders. Bhairavnath was kept outside this cave and today this holy cave is known as 'Ardha Kunwari'.

Pilgrimage route

Pilgrims travel from the city of Jammu in Jammu and Kashmir to the village of Katra which is well connected by helicopter, rail and road. From Katra, starts the uphill journey to the Vaishno Devi Temple on foot. While on the way near the Trikuta mountain is the Banganga River. It is said that Vaishno Devi shot an arrow at the ground and brought forth the Ganga river to quench Hanuman's thirst. After Hanuman disappeared, Vaishno Devi washed her hair in the water. The Banganga river is also known as the Balganga river, since "Bal" means hair and "Ganga" is synonymous with the Holy Ganga river. Pilgrims must have a bath in the Banganga river to prove their purity. After Banganga is the Charan Paduka temple. Vaishno Devi stood on a rock to look at Bhairavnath before her escape and this rock supposedly contained her footprints. Her footprints are worshipped in this temple. After having a darshan of Charan Paduka, Pilgrims come across the Ardha Kunwari Temple. Vaishno Devi meditated in this cave for 9 months, just like how a baby stays in its mother's womb for 9 months, to escape Bhairav Nath. After having a darshan of Ardha Kunwari, the pilgrims go to the Bhairav Nath temple. It is said that after Vaishno Devi killed Bhairav Nath, Bhairav Nath realised his mistake and pleaded for forgiveness. Vaishno Devi blessed him by saying that if pilgrims did not have darshan of his head, their pilgrimage will not be fruitful. Pilgrims have a darshan of Bhairavnath's head before going to Bhavan, Vaishno Devi's Temple. Pilgrims go inside the temple to have a darshan of the 3 pindikas (rocks) which represent Vaishno Devi.

Temple

The Vaishno Devi Temple is an important Hindu temple dedicated to Vaishno Devi located in Katra at the Trikuta Mountains within the Indian Union territory of Jammu and Kashmir. The temple is one of the 108 Shakti Peethas dedicated to Durga, who is worshipped as Vaishno Devi. It is one of the most visited pilgrimage centers of India. Every year millions of visitors visit the temple. During festivals like Navaratri, the count even increases to one crore visitors. Vaishno Devi Temple is one of the richest temples in India. Authors Michael Barnett and Janice Gross Stein says, "Mata Vaishno Devi Shrine in Jammu has an annual income of about $16 billion, mainly from offerings by devotees".

The temple is sacred to all Hindus. Many prominent saints such as Vivekananda have visited the temple.

Navratri and Diwali are the two most prominent festivals celebrated in the Vaishno Devi Temple. The temple was included in the Jammu & Kashmir state government Act No. XVI/1988, and known as Shree Mata Vaishno Devi Shrine Act. The committee nominated by the state government administers the temple and has nine members on its board.

See also
 Jag Janani Maa Vaishno Devi - Kahani Mata Rani Ki
 Matrikas
 Vaishnodevi Temple, Rourkela
 Hariyali Devi / Vaishno Devi Temple located in Rudraprayag district of Uttarakhand.
 Shri Mata Vaishno Devi University

References

External links 

 Maa Vaishno Devi Shrine Board

Hindu goddesses
Hindu temples in Jammu and Kashmir
Hindu pilgrimage sites in India
Shakti temples
Hindu cave temples in India
Katra, Jammu and Kashmir
Caves of Jammu and Kashmir